Busnelli is a surname. Notable people with the surname include:

 Max Busnelli (born 1975), Italian racing car driver
 Mirta Busnelli (born 1946), Argentine actress